Am Rothenbaum is the site of the main tennis court of the German Open Tennis Championships, played in the Harvestehude quarter of Hamburg, Germany. Though the site is called "Tennisstadion am Rothenbaum" (lit. Tennis Stadium at the Rothenbaum), it is today officially located in the Harvestehude quarter of Hamburg.

History  
The International German Open has been played at the "Rothenbaum" since 1892, making it Germany's longest-running tennis tournament. The current stadium was built in 1999 and holds 13,200 spectators, making it Germany's largest tennis venue. Today, it is one of the only two tournaments on German soil to be part of the ATP Tour 500 (the other being Halle Open), and one of the twenty largest tennis tournaments in the world.

Location 
"Tennisstadion am Rothenbaum" is located in Harvestehude at Hallerstraße 89, between Rothenbaumchaussee and Mittelweg. Nearest rapid transit station is Hallerstraße, directly next to the tennis park. The Außenalster, Hamburg's popular lake, is some 600 m apart.

Gallery

See also 
 List of tennis stadiums by capacity

References

External links 

 DTB site 
 German Open Tennis Championships 
 Venue details at bet-at-home-open.com
 Venue details at worldstadiums.com
 Center Court Lounge im Tennisstadion Rothenbaum

Tennis venues in Germany
Sports venues in Hamburg
Buildings and structures in Eimsbüttel
1892 establishments in Germany
Sports venues completed in 1892
Volleyball venues in Germany
Outdoor arenas